Programmed cell death 6-interacting protein also known as ALIX is a protein that in humans is encoded by the PDCD6IP gene.

This gene encodes a protein thought to participate in programmed cell death. Studies using mouse cells have shown that overexpression of this protein can block apoptosis. In addition, the product of this gene binds to the product of the PDCD6 gene, a protein required for apoptosis, in a calcium-dependent manner.  This gene product also binds to endophilins, proteins that regulate membrane shape during endocytosis. Overexpression of this gene product and endophilins results in cytoplasmic vacuolization which may be partly responsible for the protection against cell death.

Function
PDCD6IP protein is part of ESCRT pathway. It participates in the membrane scission of the revers topology budding and participates in multivesicular body formation. It is also vital at the later stages and for successful completion of cytokinesis.

Interactions
PDCD6IP has been shown to interact with PDCD6. The V domain of PDCD6IP recognises Short linear motif LYPxLxxL and this motif is mimicked by p6 late domain of HIV and related viruses which facilitates viral hijacking of ESCRT pathway and consequential budding of  viral particles.

References

Further reading

External links